Shifa Gwaliori (1912–1968) was an Urdu poet. He has written ghazals and nazms.

Biography

Shifa Gwaliori was born in Gwalior, Gwalior State. He was a disciple of the Urdu poet Seemab Akbarabadi. He has published three poetry collections. Madhya Pradesh Urdu Academy has instituted the annual Shifa Gwaliori Award as a literary award, first awarded in 2010.

See also

 List of Urdu language poets

Bibliography

Ayaat-e-Shifa
Nabz-e Hayaat
Zakhm-e-Gul

References

Urdu-language poets from India
1912 births
1968 deaths
20th-century Indian poets
Indian male poets
Poets from Madhya Pradesh
20th-century Indian male writers
People from Gwalior